The several branches of the Egyptian Armed Forces are represented by flags, among other emblems and insignia. Within each branch, various flags fly on various occasions, and on various ships, bases, camps and military academies.

In general, the order of precedence when displaying military flags together is Air Defense, Air Force, Navy and the Army.

Description 
Army

The flag of the Egyptian Army was adopted in c.1805 when the army was initially established. The flag features three horizontal stripes with two overlapping swords on the hoist side of the flag and a golden eagle, depicted in the center of the white stripe.

Navy

The flag of the Egyptian Navy was adopted in c.1800, when the Navy was founded

Air Force

The flag of the Egyptian Air Force was adopted in c.1937, when the Air Force had become an independent branch. The flag features the Egyptian Flag on the top hoist side and a target on the left side.

Air Defense

The flag of the Egyptian Air Defense Force was adopted in c.1968, when the Defense Force had formed. Similar to the Egyptian Air Force flag, it features the Egyptian flag on the hoist side and the Coat of arms on the left side

See also 
Flag of Egypt
List of Egyptian flags
Egyptian Air Defense Forces
Egyptian Air Force
Egyptian Navy
Egyptian Army

References

Armed Forces
Military flags
Flags
Military insignia